This is a list of countries by level of military equipment, including naval ships, fighter aircraft and nuclear weapons. This list is indicative only, as strict comparisons cannot accurately be made.

List

States marked 'TC' are widely considered technologically capable of wielding, operating or developing nuclear weapons, however are signatories of the Nuclear Non-Proliferation Treaty (NPT) and are not known to possess any at the current moment. Japan, South Korea and Poland  are generally considered de facto nuclear states due to their believed ability to wield nuclear weapons within 1 to 3 years. South Africa produced six nuclear weapons in the 1980s, but dismantled them in the early 1990s. South Africa signed the NPT in 1991.

Combat aircraft by country

Figures sourced from the Center for Strategic and International Studies and Flightglobal.com, unless otherwise noted.

See also
 List of countries by number of military and paramilitary personnel
 List of countries by military expenditures
 List of countries by military expenditure per capita
 List of countries by Military Strength Index
 List of countries by Global Militarization Index
 List of militaries by country

Notes

References

Bibliography 
 
 
 
 
 
 
 
 
 
 
 
 
 South African Navy official website

Further reading

External links 

 Global security website
 World Military Guide
 
 Indian Ministry of Defence
 The World Fact Book – South Africa
 Canada's Budget 2008: Taxes and the Forward March of Neoliberalism

Military equipment
Equipment